Andrei Zagdansky (born March 9, 1956) is an transnational independent documentary filmmaker and producer originally from Ukraine.

Biography
Zagdansky attended Kiev State Institute of Theatrical Arts, graduating in 1979. He worked as a film director for Kievnauchfilm studio in Kiev from 1981 through 1988, and at film studio Thursday from 1988 through 1992. In 1991, Zagdansky traveled to the United States at the invitation of the Film Society of Lincoln Center to present his Freudian film Interpretation of Dreams at the New Directors/New Films Festival at the Museum of Modern Art. Immigrating to the United States in 1992, he worked as a free-lance producer for the now defunct Russian-American Broadcasting Company from 1992 through 1999. He has also taught several film classes at New School University.

Filmography as a director/producer
2020: National Museum
2017: Garik (TV film)
2018: Michail and Daniel
2014: Vagrich and the Black Square
2013: Trottoirs de Paris
2010: My Father Evgeni
2007: Orange Winter
2006: Konstantin and Mouse
2002: Vasya
2001: Six Days
1992: Two
1990: Interpretation of Dreams
1988: Registration

References

External links

.
Andrei Zagdnsky web site
"The Color of Dissent" by Matt Zoller Seitz, The New York Times
"Ukraine's Winter of Discontent" by Bruce Bennett, New York Sun
"Orange Winter" by Joe Leydon, Variety
"Orange Winter" by Rob Humanick, Slant
Two Roads on the Trail of History by Vincent Canby, The New York Times
Documentary "Interpretation of Dreams" by Andrei Zagdansky 

American documentary film directors
Documentary film producers
1956 births
Living people